Boleslaus, son of Děpolt (c. 1190 – April 9, 1241), allegedly nicknamed Szepiołka ("Lisper" in Polish), was an exiled member of the  (a cadet branch of the Přemyslid dynasty) who with his brothers (Děpolt IV Bořivoj, Sobeslaus I, and Otto of Magdeburg) and mother Adelaide lived for most of his life in Silesia, at court of Wrocław dukes Henry the Bearded and Henry II the Pious. 

Some Polish medieval chronicles referred to him as the "Margrave of Moravia" but this title had no relevance because Bohemia and Moravia were ruled at that time jointly by kings from main Přemyslid line and title of margrave was deserved for royal princes. Moreover, Boleslaus – just like his brothers – styled himself as Dux Boemiae ("Duke of Bohemia") because until the end of his days he didn't give up a claim to govern in the Bohemian Kingdom.

Died in chivalric manner, during a lost battle with Mongol hordes which invaded the Central Europe.

Life 

In 1202, Boleslaus, together with his brother Děpolt Bořivoj, was banished by the king Přemysl Ottokar I of Bohemia but he later returned in 1204. For the second time he was exiled in 1223 by the same king, after a futile and lost attempt by his father Děpolt III to obtain the royal throne in Prague. After the death of the duke Děpolt in defence battle of Kouřim against the king Ottokar, the rest of Děpolt family went to exile at the court of Silesian ruler Henry the Bearded, as he was brother of Děpolt's wife Adéla of Silesia. Brothers Bořivoj, Sobeslaus and Boleslaus left the country with their respective druzhinas (armed retinues, companions).

Death in battle 

He commanded volunteer Bavarian miners from Silesian town Goldberg (Złotoryja) and his Czech retinue at the Battle of Legnica, alongside the Poles and Silesians. During the battle he was shot by an arrow hitting below his ear.

Notes and references 

1241 deaths
1190s births
12th-century births
People killed in action
Přemyslid dynasty
Bohemian princes